Bagnun is a soup, with anchovies as the primary ingredient, which originated in the 19th century near Sestri Levante in the province of Genoa (Italy).

History 
Originally, bagnun was cooked by the crews of typical fishing boats called leudi. Over time, it has kept its original simplicity: it is prepared, even today, with fresh anchovies, brown onions, peeled tomatoes, extra virgin olive oil, and dry bread.

Since the 1950s, Riva Trigoso, a village near the town of Sestri Levante, has held an annual Sagra del Bagnun, a festival celebrating the dish, in the last weekend of July.

See also
 Cuisine of Liguria
 List of Italian dishes
 List of Italian soups

References

External links
 Official website of Bagnun association in Riva Trigoso

Italian soups
Cuisine of Liguria
Anchovy dishes
Metropolitan City of Genoa